General elections were held in Saint Vincent and the Grenadines on 12 September 1957. The result was a victory for the People's Political Party, which won five of the eight seats. Voter turnout was 71%.

Results

References

Saint Vincent
Elections in Saint Vincent and the Grenadines
GEneral
British Windward Islands